Choreonema is a genus of red algae belonging to the family Hapalidiaceae.

The genus has almost cosmopolitan distribution.

Species:

Choreonema notarisii 
Choreonema thuretii

References

Corallinales
Red algae genera